A cobweb is a spider web.

Cobweb may also refer to:

Animals 
 Cobweb (horse) (1821–1848), a racehorse
 Cobwebbing, a pattern of fine lines on the face of a horse, zebra or other equid

Films 
 Cobweb (upcoming American film), an upcoming American horror film
 Cobweb (upcoming South Korean film), upcoming South Korean film

Literature 
 Cobweb (comics), a comic book heroine
 Cobweb, a character in A Midsummer Night's Dream by William Shakespeare
 The Cobweb (novel), by Stephen Bury (a pseudonym), 1996

Music 
Cobweb (band), a Nepalese hard rock group formed in 1993
 "Cobwebs", 2007, by the Coral from Roots & Echoes
 "Cobwebs", 1995, by Loudon Wainwright III from Grown Man
 "Cobwebs", 2010, by Motionless in White from Creatures 
 "Cobwebs", 2008, by Ryan Adams & the Cardinals from Cardinology

Other uses
 Cobwebs (audio drama), an audio drama based on Doctor Who
 Cobweb (clustering) (or COBWEB), a system for machine learning
 Cobweb, a British boat in the 1908 Summer Olympics

See also

 The Cobweb (disambiguation)
 Cobweb Bridge or Spider Bridge, a bridge in Sheffield, South Yorkshire, England
 Cobweb model, an economic model of cyclical supply and demand
 Cobweb plot, a visual tool used in the dynamical systems field of mathematics to investigate the qualitative behaviour of one-dimensional iterated functions
 Cobweb spider or tangle web spider, any spider in the family Theridiidae
 Cobweb theory, an alternative to the state-centric approach to international relations  
 Cobweb houseleek (Sempervivum arachnoideum)
 Spider Web (disambiguation)
 Cob (disambiguation)
 Web (disambiguation)